Desal  is a village in Kapurthala district of Punjab State, India. The village is administrated by a Sarpanch, who is an elected representative.

Demography 
According to the report published by Census India in 2011, Desal has a total number of 266 houses and population of 1,433 of which include 763 males and 670 females. Literacy rate of Desal is 68.43%, lower than state average of 75.84%.  The population of children under the age of 6 years is 169 which is  11.79% of total population of Desal, and child sex ratio is approximately  1012, higher than state average of 846.

Caste  
The village has schedule caste (SC) constitutes 81.02% of total population of the village and it doesn't have any Schedule Tribe (ST) population.

Population data

Air travel connectivity 
The closest airport to the village is Sri Guru Ram Dass Jee International Airport.

Villages in Kapurthala

External links
  Villages in Kapurthala
 Kapurthala Villages List

References

Villages in Kapurthala district